Bolick may refer to:

People with the surname
Robert Bolick, Filipino basketball player
Clint Bolick (born 1957), co-founder of Institute of Justice, and current Vice President of Litigation at the Goldwater Institute
Frank Bolick (born 1966), Major League Baseball player
Harry Bolick (1912–1999), American athlete and sports coach
Leonard Bolick, American pastor
The Blue Sky Boys, former country duo consisting of Earl & Bill Bolick

Places
Bolick Historic District, historic district in North Carolina